Cho Sung-hyung (born June 26, 1966) is a German film maker, director, editor and professor living and working in Germany with South Korean roots. She got German citizenship in 2016 for her documentary My Brothers and Sisters in the North.

Biography
Cho was born on 1966 in Busan, and grew up in Seoul. When she was five years old, her mother moved to West Germany, where she worked as a nurse. Cho received a BA in Mass Communications Studies from Yonsei University. In 1990, Cho moved to Marburg in Germany to pursue an MA in art history, media studies and philosophy at the University of Marburg. She continued with post-graduate studies in Theater Film and Media Sciences at Goethe University Frankfurt and a course in electronic images at Hochschule für Gestaltung Offenbach am Main.

Between 2004 and 2007, she had taught Editoring, Documentary and Dramaturgy at SAE Institute and was between 2008 and 2009, an assistant lecturer at the Technical University of Darmstadt; in 2010 as an assistant professor. Since 2011, Cho teaches as a regular professor The Art of Film/Movie Making at the University for Visual Arts of Saar in Saarbrücken, Germany.

She worked as a freelance editor and led editing seminars at the Filmhaus Frankfurt and SAE Institute. She also directed documentaries and music videos. Since 2018, she has been a member of the jury of the Federal Festival of Young Film at St. Ingbert.

Film career

Cho was an assistant editor for the German television series Ein Fall für zwei, also working on documentaries and music videos. Her documentary Full Metal Village received the Hessian Film Award in 2006 and the Max Ophüls Prize and was named best documentary by the Guild of German Art House Cinemas in 2007.

In 2016, Cho had filmed and was starring in the documentary Meine Brüder und Schwestern in Nordkorea – other international titles: Meine Brüder und Schwestern im Norden, My Brothers and Sisters in the North. She was the first South Korean director who was allowed to visit North Korea after Korean War without being charged for treason by South Korea, because she has a German passport. She gave up South Korean citizenship and took the German one just for making this documentary and getting a visa and the permission of shooting from North Korea.

Selected filmography

Director & Editor 
 Full Metal Village (2006) 
 Home from Home (2009)
 11 Freundinnen (2011)
 Endstation Der Sehnsuchte (2012)
 Far East Devotion – Love Letters from Pyongyang (2015)
 Two Voices From Korea (2015)
 My Brothers and Sisters in the North (2016)

Editor Only 
 Freudenhaus (2001)
 Verirrte Eskimos (2003)
 Parzifal in Isfahan (2004)

Awards

Won 
 2006: Schleswig-Holstein Film Award for Full Metal Village
 2006: Hessian Film Award for Full Metal Village
 2007: Max Ophüls Award for Full Metal Village as first documentary ever
 2007: Guild of German Art House Cinemas Award for Full Metal Village
 2007: Award for advancing of upcoming artists of the DEFA Foundation
 2009: Best regional long film of 2. Lichter film festival for Endstation der Sehnsücht 
 2016: Best regional long film of 9. Lichter film festival for eine Brüder und Schwesterin im Norde
 2016: Best documentary film at 26. Filmkunstfests Mecklenburg-Vorpommern for Meine Brüder und Schwesterin im Norde

Norminated 
 2007 Golden Eye Award Zurich Film Festival for Full Metal Village

References

External links 
 
 Personal homepage
 Personal university homepage

1966 births
Living people
South Korean women film directors
South Korean film editors
People from Busan
People from Seoul
University of Marburg alumni
Women film editors
Yonsei University alumni